Justine Henin was the defending champion, but retired from the sport on May 14, 2008.

Agnieszka Radwańska won the title, defeating Nadia Petrova in the final 6–4, 6–7(11–13), 6–4.

Seeds
The top four seeds receive a bye into the second round.

Draw

Finals

Top half

Bottom half

External links
Draw and Qualifying Draw

Singles
International Women's Open